The Browse LNG was a liquefied natural gas plant project proposed for construction at James Price Point,  north of Broome on the Dampier Peninsula, Western Australia.  It was considered by a joint venture including Woodside Petroleum, Shell, BP, Japan Australia LNG and BHP Billiton.  It would have processed natural gas extracted from the Browse Basin. Liquefied natural gas would then be shipped from a port facility also located in the Browse LNG Precinct.

The onshore project was abandoned by the joint venture after Australia's rising costs made the project unviable. This project is now to be developed as a floating LNG facility with minimal construction work to be undertaken in Australia.

Joint venture
, the owners of the joint venture were: 
Woodside Petroleum (Operator)
Shell
BP
Japan Australia LNG (MIMI Browse) (a joint venture of Mitsubishi and Mitsui)
BHP Billiton

In December 2012, PetroChina agreed to buy BHP Billiton's 8.3% stake in the East Browse and 20% holding in the West Browse joint venture for US$1.63 billion. The transaction is subject to regulatory approval and an option for the other members of the joint venture to match the offer.

Technical description
The Browse Basin is estimated to contain combined contingent volumes of 15.9 trillion cubic feet of dry gas and 436 million barrels of condensate. The reserves are contained in the Torosa, Brecknock, and Calliance fields.

Native title
The Kimberley Land Council, as the representatives of the local Goolarabooloo Jabirr Jabirr Aboriginal people under the 1993 Native Title Act, supported the onshore project by 60% of votes.

However, some traditional owners are currently in a legal challenge against this decision. In a press statement they say "…many local Indigenous people are disgusted by the apparent abandonment of the established process put in place by the previous State government. Concerns include the threats made earlier in the year by the Premier regarding compulsory acquisition of land and the pre-empting of the Joint State and Commonwealth environmental and cultural assessment process via announcements by Woodside and the Premier."

Environmental concerns
According to Australian Greens, construction of the port facilities, including the dredging and blasting of reefs and seabed, is expected to result in a  "marine deadzone".

The involvement by the Australian Greens has been heavily criticised by Jabirr elder Rita Augustine, representing the Environmental and Cultural Heritage Team and Jabirrlabirr Traditional Owners, who wrote an open letter to Bob Brown in August 2012. Augustine's criticism included comments such as: "The only thing we need saving from is people who disrespect our decisions and want to see our people locked up in a wilderness and treated as museum pieces"; and  "what saddens me most is your complete disregard for Aboriginal people. I know you care about the whales and the dinosaur footprints, but what about people?"

According to a newspaper report, quoting a single scientist,  construction is also expected to irreparably damage a large number of fossils unique to the area, including the only example of dinosaur footprint extant in Western Australia.

Some of the concerns regarding the fossil record are at odds with published reports on the area however; with a report on the significance of the dinosaur footprints stating that they are not of museum quality, are often degraded by erosional processes, and that many "footprints" identified by the public are in fact the results of erosion of the Broome Sandstone and not the result of biological origin (i.e. they are not fossils or fossil remnants).

A coalition of 25 international conservation groups has raised questions as to how it may impact the area's wildlife, especially as the area is "an important habitat for marine turtles, whales and seabirds". Broome's coast is home to the world's largest humpback whale nursery, five species of turtle, dugong, coral reefs and snubfin dolphin.

The Environmental Protection Authority report on the Browse Liquified Gas Precinct noted that: birthing grounds for the Humpback Whales are between 60 km and 240 km North of James Price Point; when the whales pass by the James Price Point, 95% of them pass more than 8 km off the point; and that as long as the EPA conditions are met, the protection on whales and turtles at the population level are likely to be met. The Sea Shepherd Conservation Society disputed the EPA study findings, referring to a non-peer reviewed documentary by Fair Projects, produced in collaboration with the Sea Shepherd Conservation Society, which purportedly showed video footage of hundreds of whales in the James Price Point area within 8 km of the coast line.

On 16 July 2012, the Environmental Protection Authority announced it had recommended the project for "strict conditional approval" and that "the precinct would provide for multiple users to be co-located on a single site, avoiding a number of LNG processing sites to spread along the coast and in more sensitive parts of the Kimberley."

See also
Wheatstone LNG
Gladstone LNG

References

Proposed liquefied natural gas plants
Natural gas in Western Australia
Kimberley (Western Australia)